Gabrielle Joy "Gabby" Sutcliffe (born 11 April 2002) is an Australian cricketer who plays as a right-arm medium pace bowler and right-handed batter for the ACT Meteors in the Women's National Cricket League (WNCL). She played in one match for Sydney Thunder in the 2020–21 WBBL season but was not required to bat or bowl. She made her debut for the Meteors on 7 March 2021, taking three for 66 against the New South Wales Breakers.

References

External links

Gabby Sutcliffe at Cricket Australia

2002 births
Living people
Sportswomen from New South Wales
Cricketers from New South Wales
Australian women cricketers
ACT Meteors cricketers
Sydney Thunder (WBBL) cricketers